Patrick Valentine Bourke (6 November 1923 – 23 September 2005) was an Australian rules footballer who played with South Melbourne in the Victorian Football League (VFL).

Personal life
Bourke served as a lance corporal in the Australian Army during the Second World War.

Notes

External links 

1923 births
Australian rules footballers from Melbourne
Sydney Swans players
2005 deaths
Australian Army personnel of World War II
Australian Army soldiers
People from Preston, Victoria
Military personnel from Melbourne